Diane Lane is an American actress who made her motion picture debut in George Roy Hill's 1979 film A Little Romance.

Lane would earn critical acclaim for her performance as Constance "Connie" Sumner in Adrian Lyne's 2002 film Unfaithful, and was nominated for the Academy Award for Best Actress, in addition to nominations for the Golden Globe and Screen Actors Guild Award.

Other notable film credits for Lane include The Outsiders (1983), The Perfect Storm (2000), Under the Tuscan Sun (2003), and as Martha Kent in Zack Snyder's films Man of Steel (2013), Batman v Superman: Dawn of Justice (2016), Justice League (2017) and Zack Snyder's Justice League (2021).

Film

Television

Stage

References

Actress filmographies
American filmographies

External links
 Diane Lane at the Internet Movie Database